FC Kharaatsai, (in mongolian: футзалын Слуб Хараацаи) is a Mongolian football club, competing in the Mongolia Second League.

Second League

In 2019, the team played in the first edition of the 2019, which despite the name, corresponds to the 3rd level in the pyramid of Mongolian football.

In total, the team played 8 matches in the competition, six wins, one draw and one defeat.

With this great campaign, the team finished the competition and second place, behind only the BCH Lions team, which was the champion of the competition.

Titles
Runner-up of the Mongolia Second League in 2019.

Female team

The club also maintains a women's team that disputes the Women's National Football League, the Mongolian championship of the category.

References

Football clubs in Mongolia